Kristine Valdresdatter is a Norwegian silent film from 1930. This was the last silent film produced in Norway and it was directed by Rasmus Breistein. Breistein also wrote the script, which was based on Hans Andersen Foss's novel Kristine: En fortælling fra Valdres (Kristine: A Tale from Valdres). The film premiered on 26 December 1930 and it has been aired several times by NRK.

Plot
Every year, Lord Wakefield comes to Vang in the Valdres district to go fishing on the lakes. He stays at the Solbjør farm, which is owned by the bailiff Erik Solbjør. There the lord meets the beautiful Anne and falls in love with her. The next spring she gives birth to a daughter. In despair, Anne places the child on the steps of the Solbjør farm and then drowns herself in a lake.

Erik cares for the girl and raises her as his own. He names her Kristine Valdresdatter (i.e., Kristine, daughter of Valdres). As she grows up, Kristine falls in love with her schoolmate Harald. In adulthood, Harald becomes difficult to deal with, prone to drinking and fighting. Kristine tries to change his behavior without success. Harald is also an accomplished fiddler, and he goes on the road to perform. Kristine travels to England with Lord Wakefield, where her beautiful singing voice develops. The lord's great dream is to hear her sing at Vang Church. However, Kristine and Harald cannot forget each other, and they start exchanging letters. Harald writes that he has stopped drinking, and one summer they meet again at the home in Vang. Lord Wakefield is also there. He is seriously ill, and on his deathbed he reveals to Kristine that he is her father and that he has made her his heiress.

Cast
Aase Bye: Kristine
Tore Foss: Harald Bergli
Rasmus Rasmussen: Erik Solbjør, the bailiff
Harald Schwenzen: Lord Wakefield
Kristian Aamodt: Anton Møller
Carl Hagerup Aspevold: Ola Vik ("Storeviken"), the local historian
Sigurd Eldegard: Peder Bergli
Per Haldor: Harald as a child
Signe Johansen: Kristine as a child
Emma Juel: Erik Solbjør's wife
Ole Leikvang: the schoolmaster
Peter Leirah: the priest
Tora Leirah: the priest's wife
Helga Balle Lund: Anne, the milkmaid
Mildred Mehle: a farm girl
Signe Ramberg: Kari Fjellstugu
Ørnulf Øiseth: Tolleif, a farm boy

References

External links 
 
 Norsk filmografi: Kristine Valdresdatter

1930 films
Norwegian silent feature films
Films directed by Rasmus Breistein
Norwegian black-and-white films
1930 romantic drama films
Norwegian romantic drama films
1930s Norwegian-language films
Silent romantic drama films